Dalvíkurvöllur is a multi-use stadium in Dalvík, Iceland. It is currently used mostly for football matches and is the home stadium of Dalvík/Reynir. Its capacity is around 2000.

References

Football venues in Iceland